Dirdal Church is a parish church of the Church of Norway in Gjesdal Municipality in Rogaland county, Norway. It is located in the village of Dirdal. It is one of the three churches for the Gjesdal parish which is part of the Jæren prosti (deanery) in the Diocese of Stavanger. The white, wooden church was built in a long church style in 1903 using designs by the architect Ola Knutson Moluf. The church seats about 175 people.

History
In 1889, the villagers of Dirdal received permission to build a cemetery for the residents of the area. Demand for a local church was growing due to the long distances the residents had to travel to get to the nearby Forsand Church. In 1903, the village received permission to build an annex chapel. The new chapel was designed by Ola Knutson Moluf who was from Frafjord. The chapel was consecrated on 9 December 1903. In 2005, the chapel was re-titled as Dirdal Church.

See also
List of churches in Rogaland

References

Gjesdal
Churches in Rogaland
Wooden churches in Norway
20th-century Church of Norway church buildings
Churches completed in 1903
1903 establishments in Norway